Francis Edward Hovell-Thurlow-Cumming-Bruce, 8th Baron Thurlow,  (9 March 1912 – 24 March 2013) was a British diplomat. He was the last surviving former British colonial governor of The Bahamas.

Thurlow was the second son of the Reverend Charles Hovell-Thurlow-Cumming-Bruce, 6th Baron Thurlow, and a grandson of the Liberal politician Thomas Hovell-Thurlow-Cumming-Bruce, 5th Baron Thurlow, who served as Paymaster-General under William Ewart Gladstone. In 1971 he succeeded his elder brother as 8th Baron Thurlow.

Biography 
Thurlow was educated at Shrewsbury School and Trinity College, Cambridge, where he graduated to Master of Arts (M.A.).

Thurlow was a civil servant at the Department of Agriculture in Scotland from 1935–37 and through the period of World War II was secretary at the British High Commission in New Zealand 1939-44 and in Canada 1944–45. He was Private Secretary to the Secretary of State for Commonwealth Relations from 1947 to 1949, then counsellor to the British High Commission in New Delhi, India, 1949–52.  He became adviser to the Governor of the Gold Coast in 1955; when that colony became independent as Ghana in 1957 he was appointed Britain's first Deputy High Commissioner there, moving on to become Deputy High Commissioner in Canada in 1959.

He served as High Commissioner to New Zealand from 1959 to 1963, as High Commissioner to Nigeria from 1963 to 1966, Deputy Under-Secretary of State at the Foreign and Commonwealth Office in 1964, and as Governor of The Bahamas from 1968 to 1972.

After retiring from the service he was appointed chairman of the Institute of Comparative Study of History, Philosophy and the Sciences in 1975.

Thurlow's younger identical twin brother Sir Roualeyn Cumming-Bruce, PC, was a Judge of the High Court of Justice and a Lord Justice of Appeal.

Personal life 
Thurlow married Yvonne Diana Wilson on 11 August 1949. They had four children.

Death 
Thurlow died in England at the age of 101.

Arms

References

External links

Diplomatic peers
1912 births
2013 deaths
Alumni of Trinity College, Cambridge
British centenarians
British governors of the Bahamas
British identical twins
High Commissioners of the United Kingdom to New Zealand
High Commissioners of the United Kingdom to Nigeria
Knights Commander of the Order of St Michael and St George
Men centenarians
People educated at Shrewsbury School
20th-century Bahamian people
20th-century British politicians
Francis
Francis
Thurlow